Ryoma Aoki (青木涼真, Aoki Ryōma, born 16 June 1997) is a Japanese long-distance runner. He competed in the 3000 metres steeplechase at the 2020 Summer Olympics.

References

External links
 

1997 births
Living people
Japanese long-distance runners
Japanese male steeplechase runners
Athletes (track and field) at the 2020 Summer Olympics
Olympic athletes of Japan
Place of birth missing (living people)
21st-century Japanese people